This is a list of notable current and former fire stations, which are also called "fire houses", "fire halls", "engine houses", "hook and ladder companies" and other terms.  It includes combination buildings, such as city halls or other government buildings that include a fire station.  This list is intended to include all historic fire stations which have formally been listed on historic registers, as well as modern ones notable for their architecture or other reasons.

This list is not intended to cover fire department buildings that are purely administrative.  Nor does it cover specialty buildings serving as fire alarm headquarters or pumping stations for water supply systems dedicated to firefighting;  for these see List of fire department specialty facilities.  Note the term "engine houses" may refer to other collections of engines, e.g. for supplying power to factories;  these are covered in a separate list of engine houses.

Narrow towers rising above many fire station buildings are hose towers, for purpose of cleaning and drying fire hoses.  But some have fire lookout towers, some have bell towers or clock towers and some have firefighting training towers or "drill towers".

Australia

New South Wales
Crows Nest Fire Station
Berry Fire Station

Queensland

Albion Fire Station (1925–27)
Balmoral Fire Station (1926–29)
Coorparoo Fire Station (1935)
Dalby Fire Station (1935)
Ithaca Fire Station (1918–19)
Nundah Fire Station (1936)
Redcliffe Fire Station (1948–49)
Wynnum Fire Station (1922–38)
Yeronga Fire Station (1934)

South Australia
Adelaide Fire Station

Former stations

Hindmarsh Fire and Folk Museum
Mount Gambier Fire Station
North Adelaide Fire Station
Unley Fire Station, now the home of the Unley Museum

Victoria

Keilor Fire Station
Belltower, Maryborough Fire Station
Ballarat East Fire Station (1858), one end of the world's first operational telephone, and the oldest continuously operating fire station in the Southern Hemisphere
Ballarat Fire Station (1860), the other end
Elsternwick Fire Station (1896)
Prahran Fire Station (1889)
Bendigo Fire Station (1898–99)
Eastern Hill Fire Station, Melbourne, now the Fire Services Museum of Victoria
Carlton Fire Station
Hawthorn Fire Station
Brunswick Fire Station and Flats
Former Fire Station
Richmond Fire Station (1893)
Richmond Metropolitan Fire Station (1905–10)
St Arnaud Fire Station

Western Australia

Bassendean Fire Station
Fremantle Fire Station
Old Perth Fire Station, Perth, the first purpose-built fire station in Western Australia, home of Fire & Emergency Services Education and Heritage Centre
No. 1 Fire Station, 25 Murray St, Perth, home of the Western Australian Fire Brigade Museum
Toodyay Fire Station
York Fire Station

Canada
The Walterdale Playhouse, Edmonton, Alberta
Firehall Arts Centre, Vancouver, British Columbia
Historic hose tower, Paisley, Ontario (:File:Hose tower paisley 2009 tac.jpg)
No. 8 Hose Station, Toronto, Ontario
The Old Fire Hall, Toronto, Ontario
List of historic Toronto fire stations, Ontario
Fire Fighters Museum (Winnipeg, Manitoba), in a 1904 fire station building
Caserne de pompiers, Chambly, Quebec, photo here
Prince Albert Historical Museum, Prince Albert, Saskatchewan, in the city's 1912 fire hall
Former Fire Hall No. 3, Saskatoon, Saskatchewan

China
Fire Services Museum, Macau, in a historic fire station

Denmark
Aarhus Fire Station
Copenhagen Central Fire Station
Frederiksberg Fire Station
Gentofte Fire Station

Estonia
Estonian Firefighting Museum, Tallinn, located in a fire station

Finland
Tampere Central Fire Station (1908)

France
Champerret barrack, Paris

Hong Kong
Old Kowloon Fire Station
Tsim Sha Tsui Fire Station
Tsing Yi Fire Station
List of fire stations in Hong Kong

New Zealand
Lower Hutt Central Fire Station

Philippines
San Nicolas Fire Station

Russia
Kostroma watchtower/fire station

Singapore
 Central Fire Station, Singapore

Taiwan
 Hsinchu City Fire Museum, Hsinchu
 Tainan City Fire Bureau Second Division, Tainan

United Kingdom

Barnet Fire Station, London Borough of Barnet
Barrow-in-Furness Central Fire Station, Barrow-in-Furness, Cumbria
Chelsea Fire Station, Chelsea, London
Chiltern Firehouse, Marylebone, London
Euston Fire Station, London
Fulham Fire Station, Fulham, London
Hammersmith Fire Station, Hammersmith, London
Lambeth Fire Station, London; former headquarters of London Fire Brigade
London Road Fire Station, Manchester
New Cross Fire Station, New Cross, London 
Woolwich Fire Station, Woolwich, London
List of fire stations in Kent
National Emergency Services Museum, Sheffield, England, in a former combined police and fire station (1900).  It has one of few remaining Fire Brigade observation towers in the UK.

United States
In the U.S., numerous fire stations are listed on the National Register of Historic Places (NRHP) and there are other notable ones as well.

Alabama

Glen Addie Volunteer Hose Company Fire Hall, Anniston, Alabama, NRHP-listed
Fire Station No. 3 (Birmingham, Alabama), NRHP-listed
Fire Station No. 6 (Birmingham, Alabama), NRHP-listed
Fire Station No. 10 (Birmingham, Alabama), NRHP-listed
Fire Station No. 11 (Birmingham, Alabama), NRHP-listed
Fire Station No. 12 (Birmingham, Alabama), NRHP-listed. Tudor Revival in style.
Fire Station No. 15 (Birmingham, Alabama), NRHP-listed
Fire Station No. 16 (Birmingham, Alabama), NRHP-listed
Fire Station No. 19 (Birmingham, Alabama), NRHP-listed
Fire Station No. 22 (Birmingham, Alabama), NRHP-listed
Wylam Fire Station, Birmingham, AL, NRHP-listed
Fire Station No. 5 (Mobile, Alabama), NRHP-listed
Scott Street Firehouse, Montgomery, AL, NRHP-listed

Alaska
No notable fire stations known.

Arizona
Old Nogales City Hall and Fire Station, Nogales, AZ, NRHP-listed

Arkansas

Fayetteville Fire Department Fire Station 1, Fayetteville, Arkansas, NRHP-listed
Fayetteville Fire Department Fire Station 3, Fayetteville, Arkansas, NRHP-listed
Old Little Rock Central Fire Station, Little Rock, Arkansas, NRHP-listed
Old Central Fire Station (North Little Rock, Arkansas), NRHP-listed
Park Hill Fire Station and Water Company Complex, North Little Rock, Arkansas, NRHP-listed

California
Auburn City Hall and Fire House, Auburn, CA, NRHP-listed
Auburn Fire House No. 1, Auburn, CA, NRHP-listed
Auburn Fire House No. 2, Auburn, CA, NRHP-listed
Washington Township Museum of Local History (Fremont, California), Fremont, CA, in a former fire station
Engine Co. No. 27, now the Los Angeles Fire Department Museum and Memorial, Los Angeles, CA, NRHP-listed
Old Plaza Firehouse, Los Angeles, CA, NRHP-contributing, home of the Plaza Firehouse Museum
 Fire Station No. 1 (Los Angeles, California), List of Los Angeles Historic-Cultural Monuments on the East and Northeast Sides
 Engine House No. 18 (Los Angeles, California), NRHP-listed
 Fire Station No. 14 (Los Angeles, California), historic all-black segregated fire station, NRHP-listed
 Fire Station No. 23 (Los Angeles, California), NRHP-listed
 Fire Station No. 30, Engine Company No. 30, historic all-black segregated fire station and engine company, NRHP-listed, home of African American Firefighter Museum
 Engine Company No. 28, Los Angeles, CA, NRHP-listed
Nevada City Firehouse No. 2, Nevada City, CA, NRHP-listed
Oceanside City Hall and Fire Station, Oceanside, CA, NRHP-listed
Arlington Branch Library and Fire Hall, Riverside, CA, NRHP-listed
Firehouse No. 3 (Sacramento, California), NRHP-listed
 Fire Station No. 6 (Sacramento, California), NRHP-listed
 Engine House No. 31 (San Francisco, California), NRHP-listed
San Francisco Fire Department Engine Co. Number 2, San Francisco, CA, NRHP-listed
Santa Ana Fire Station Headquarters No. 1, Santa Ana, CA, NRHP-listed

Colorado

Fire Station No. 1 (Denver, Colorado), NRHP-listed, home of the Denver Firefighters Museum and a Denver Landmark
Fire Station No. 3 (Denver, Colorado), a Denver Landmark
Fire Station No. 7 (Denver, Colorado), a Denver Landmark
Fire Station No. 11 (Denver, Colorado), a Denver Landmark
Fire Station No. 14 (Denver, Colorado), a Denver Landmark 
Fire Station No. 15 (Denver, Colorado), a Denver Landmark
Fire Station No. 18 (Denver, Colorado), a Denver Landmark
Alpine Hose Company No. 2, Georgetown, Colorado, NRHP-listed
Goldfield City Hall and Fire Station, Goldfield, Colorado, NRHP-listed
Bryan Hose House, Idaho Springs, Colorado, NRHP-listed
Hose House No. 2 (Idaho Springs, Colorado), NRHP-listed
Longmont Fire Department, Longmont, Colorado, NRHP-listed
Sedalia Historic Fire House Museum, Sedalia, Colorado
Silver Cliff Fire Station and City Hall, Silver Cliff, Colorado (see :File:Original Silver Cliff Firehouse & Town Hall.JPG )

Connecticut
Engine Company 1 Fire Station, Hartford, CT, NRHP-listed
Engine Company 2 Fire Station, Hartford, CT, NRHP-listed
Engine Company 6 Fire Station, Hartford, CT, NRHP-listed
Engine Company 9 Fire Station, Hartford, CT, NRHP-listed
 Engine Company 15 Fire Station, Hartford, CT, NRHP-listed
 Engine Company 16 Fire Station, Hartford, CT, NRHP-listed
Charter Oak Firehouse, Meriden, CT, NRHP-listed
Hose and Hook and Ladder Truck Building, Thomaston, CT, NRHP-listed
Torrington Fire Department Headquarters, Torrington, CT, NRHP-listed
Tunxis Hose Firehouse, Unionville, CT, NRHP-listed
Former Fire Station, Windsor, CT, NRHP-listed

Delaware
Old Bridgeville Fire House, Bridgeville, DE, NRHP-listed
Old Fire House, Milford, DE, NRHP-listed
Aetna Hose, Hook and Ladder Company, Fire Station No. 1, Newark, DE, NRHP-listed
Aetna Hose, Hook and Ladder Company Fire Station No. 2, Newark, DE, NRHP-listed
 Water Witch Steam Fire Engine Company No. 5, Wilmington, DE, NRHP-listed

Florida
Boca Raton Fire Engine No. 1, Boca Raton, FL, NRHP-listed
Coral Gables Police and Fire Station, Coral Gables, FL, NRHP-listed
Catherine Street Fire Station, Jacksonville, FL, NRHP-listed, home of the Jacksonville Fire Museum
Fire Station No. 2 (Miami, Florida), NRHP-listed
Fire Station No. 4 (Miami, Florida), NRHP-listed
Ormond Fire House, Ormond Beach, FL, NRHP-listed
Central Station (Sebring, Florida), NRHP-listed

Georgia
Fire Station No. 2 (1901), Athens, Georgia, a gridiron-shaped station included in the Cobbham Historic District
Fire Station No. 6, Atlanta, Georgia, included in the Martin Luther King Jr. National Historical Park
Fire Station No. 11 (Atlanta, Georgia), listed on the NRHP in Georgia
Fire Station 19 (Atlanta, Georgia)
Engine Company Number One, Augusta, NRHP-listed
City Hall and Firehouse, Bainbridge, Georgia, included in NRHP-listed Bainbridge Commercial Historic District
City Fire Department (Columbus, Georgia), NRHP-listed
Mechanics Engine House No. 4, Macon, Georgia, NRHP-listed
Statesboro City Hall and Fire Station, Statesboro, Georgia, NRHP-listed

Hawaii
Palama Fire Station (1901), Honolulu, HI, NRHP-listed
Kalihi Fire Station (1924), Honolulu, HI, NRHP-listed
Waialua Fire Station (1932), Haleiwa, HI, NRHP-listed
Waipahu Fire Station (1932), Art Deco style, adjoins historic City of Refuge Christian Church (New Waipahu Theater), 94-897 Waipahu Rd., Waipahu,
Central Fire Station (1934), 104 S. Beretania St., Honolulu, NRHP-listed
Makiki Fire Station, Honolulu, HI, NRHP-listed
Kaimuki Fire Station, Honolulu, HI, NRHP-listed
Kakaako Fire Station, Honolulu, HI, NRHP-listed
Fire Station (Protestant Missionary Church), 1853 Beretania St., Kalaupapa, Molokai.

Idaho
South Boise Fire Station, Boise, ID, NRHP-listed

Illinois
Central Fire Station (Aurora, Illinois), home of the Aurora Regional Fire Museum, Aurora, Illinois
Collinsville City Hall and Fire Station, Collinsville, Illinois, NRHP-listed
Fire Barn 5 (Elgin, Illinois), home of the Elgin Fire Barn No. 5 Museum, NRHP-listed
Maywood Fire Department Building, Maywood, Illinois, NRHP-listed
Pontiac City Hall and Fire Station, Pontiac, Illinois, NRHP-listed

Indiana

Fire Station Number 4 (Columbus, Indiana), designed by Robert Venturi, 1966 in architecture
Hose House No. 10, Evansville, IN, NRHP-listed
Hose House No. 12, Evansville, IN, NRHP-listed
Old Hose House No. 4, Evansville, IN, formerly NRHP-listed, demolished
 Engine House No. 3 (Fort Wayne, Indiana), NRHP-listed
 Huntingburg Town Hall and Fire Engine House, Huntingburg, IN, NRHP-listed
Indianapolis Fire Headquarters and Municipal Garage, Indianapolis, IN, NRHP-listed
Broad Ripple Firehouse-Indianapolis Fire Department Station 32, Indianapolis, IN, NRHP-listed
Mishawaka Fire Station No. 4, Mishawaka, IN, NRHP-listed
 Fire Station No. 1 (Muncie, Indiana), NRHP-listed
Plymouth Fire Station, Plymouth, IN, NRHP-listed
Fire House No. 3, South Bend, IN, NRHP-listed
Fire Station No. 7 (South Bend, Indiana), NRHP-listed
Spencer Town Hall and Fire Station, Spencer, IN, NRHP-listed
 Fire Station No. 9 (Terre Haute, Indiana), NRHP-listed
Terre Haute Fire Station No. 8, Terre Haute, IN, NRHP-listed

Iowa

Municipal Building (Ames, Iowa), NRHP-listed
Cedar Rapids Central Fire Station, Cedar Rapids, IA, NRHP-listed
Chariton City Hall and Fire Station, Chariton, IA, NRHP-listed
 Central Fire Station (Davenport, Iowa), NRHP-listed
Hose Station No. 1, Davenport, IA, NRHP-listed
Davenport Hose Station No. 3, Davenport, IA, NRHP-listed
Hose Station No. 6, Davenport, IA, NRHP-listed
Hose Station No. 7, Davenport, IA, NRHP-listed
Des Moines Fire Department Headquarters' Fire Station No. 1 and Shop Building, Des Moines, IA, NRHP-listed
Fire Station No. 4 (Des Moines, Iowa), NRHP-listed
Hose Station No. 4, Davenport, IA, contributing to NRHP-listed Village of East Davenport, home of International Fire Museum
Hawarden City Hall, Fire Station and Auditorium, Hawarden, IA, NRHP-listed
LaPorte City Town Hall and Fire Station, La Porte City, IA, NRHP-listed
Oskaloosa Fire Station, Oskaloosa, IA, NRHP-listed
Red Oak Firehouse and City Jail, Red Oak, IA, NRHP-listed
Sioux City Fire Station Number 3, Sioux City, IA, NRHP-listed
Hope Fire Company Engine House, Toledo, IA, NRHP-listed
Fire Station No. 2 (Waterloo, Iowa), NRHP-listed
Valley Junction-West Des Moines City Hall and Engine House, West Davenport, IA, NRHP-listed

Kansas
Fire Station No. 9 (Kansas City, Kansas), NRHP-listed
Kansas City, Kansas City Hall and Fire Headquarters, Kansas City, KS, NRHP-listed
Fire Station No. 2 (Topeka, Kansas), NRHP-listed
Engine House No. 6 (Wichita, Kansas), NRHP-listed

Kentucky
Florence Fire Station, Florence, KY, NRHP-listed
Historic Firehouses of Louisville:
Fire Department Headquarters, Louisville, KY, NRHP-listed
Firehouse No. 13, Louisville, KY, NRHP-listed
Hook and Ladder Company No. 2, Louisville, KY, NRHP-listed
Hook and Ladder Company No. 3, Louisville, KY, NRHP-listed
Hook and Ladder Company No. 4, Louisville, KY, NRHP-listed
Hook and Ladder Company No. 5, Louisville, KY, NRHP-listed
Steam Engine Company No. 2, Louisville, KY, NRHP-listed
Steam Engine Company No. 3, Louisville, KY, NRHP-listed
Steam Engine Company No. 4 (Logan Street), Louisville, KY, NRHP-listed
Steam Engine Company No. 4 (Main Street), Louisville, KY, NRHP-listed
Steam Engine Company No. 7, Louisville, KY, NRHP-listed
Steam Engine Company No. 10, Louisville, KY, NRHP-listed
Steam Engine Company No. 11, Louisville, KY, NRHP-listed
Steam Engine Company No. 18, Louisville, KY, NRHP-listed
Steam Engine Company No. 20 (1330 Bardstown Road), Louisville, Kentucky, NRHP-listed
Steam Engine Company No. 20 (1735 Bardstown Road), Louisville, Kentucky, NRHP-listed
Steam Engine Company No. 21, Louisville, KY, NRHP-listed
Steam Engine Company No. 22, Louisville, KY, NRHP-listed

Louisiana
Central Fire Station (Baton Rouge, Louisiana), NRHP-listed
David Crockett Fire Hall and Pumper, Gretna, LA, NRHP-listed
Ruston Central Fire Station, in Ruston, Louisiana, NRHP-listed
Central Fire Station (Shreveport, Louisiana), NRHP-listed
South Highlands Fire Station, Shreveport, LA, NRHP-listed
Shreveport Fire Station No. 8, Shreveport, LA, NRHP-listed

Maine
Andover Hook and Ladder Company Building, Andover, ME, NRHP-listed
 Engine House (Auburn, Maine), NRHP-listed
Bangor Fire Engine House No. 6, Bangor, ME, NRHP-listed
Bangor Hose House No. 5, Bangor, ME, NRHP-listed, now the Hose 5 Fire Museum
Monson Engine House, Monson, ME, NRHP-listed, now the Monson Historical Society Museum 
 Old Fire Engine House, Orono, ME, NRHP-listed
 Engine Company Number Nine Firehouse, Portland, ME, NRHP-listed
Portland Fire Museum, Portland, Maine, in the former home of Fire Engine 4
Saco Central Fire Station, Saco, ME, NRHP-listed
Skowhegan Fire Station, Skowhegan, ME, NRHP-listed

Maryland
Old City Hall and Engine House, Annapolis, Maryland, NRHP-listed
 Engine House No. 6 (Baltimore, Maryland), NRHP-listed
 Engine House No. 8 (Baltimore, Maryland), NRHP-listed, now partly restored at Fire Museum of Maryland, Lutherville, MD
Paca Street Firehouse, Baltimore, MD, NRHP-listed
Poppleton Fire Station, Baltimore, MD, NRHP-listed
Canada Hose Company Building, Cumberland, MD, NRHP-listed

Massachusetts

Park Street Firehouse, Adams, MA, NRHP-listed
Highland Hose House, Arlington, MA, NRHP-listed
Falls Fire Station No. 2, Attleborough Falls/North Attleborough, MA, NRHP-listed, home of Falls Fire Barn Museum
Hose House No. 2 (Beverly, Massachusetts), NRHP-listed
941–955 Boylston Street, Boston, MA, in the Back Bay
Congress Street Fire Station, Boston, MA, NRHP-listed, home of the Boston Fire Museum
Engine House No. 34 (Boston, Massachusetts), NRHP-listed
Harvard Avenue Fire Station, Boston, MA, NRHP-listed
Central Fire Station (Brockton, Massachusetts), NRHP-listed
Fire Station No. 7 (Brookline, Massachusetts) (1898), NRHP-listed
Kendall Hotel (1895), Cambridge, MA, in 1895 firehouse, one of the Historic Hotels of America
River Street Firehouse, Cambridge, MA, NRHP-listed
Taylor Square Firehouse, Cambridge, MA, NRHP-listed
Central Fire Station (Falmouth, Massachusetts), NRHP-listed
Cataract Engine Company No. 3, Fall River, MA, NRHP-listed
Massasoit Fire House No. 5, Fall River, MA, NRHP-listed
Pocasset Firehouse No. 7, Fall River, MA, NRHP-listed
Elm Street Fire Station, Gardner, MA, NRHP-listed
Lake Street Fire Station, Gardner, MA, NRHP-listed
Engine House No. 6 (Lawrence, Massachusetts), NRHP-listed
Engine No. 2, Marblehead, MA (:File:Marblehead Massachusetts firehouse Engine No 2.JPG)
Hydrant No. 3 House, Metcalf Village, Holliston, Massachusetts, NRHP-listed
Fire Station No. 4 (New Bedford, Massachusetts), NRHP-listed, home of New Bedford Fire Museum
Peabody Central Fire Station, Peabody, MA, NRHP-listed
Old Central Fire Station (Pittsfield, Massachusetts), NRHP-listed
Central Fire Station (Quincy, Massachusetts), NRHP-listed
Quincy Point Fire Station, Quincy, MA, NRHP-listed
Wollaston Fire Station, Quincy, MA, NRHP-listed
Old Hose House, Reading, MA, NRHP-listed
North Street Fire Station, Salem, MA, NRHP-listed
South Lancaster Engine House, South Lancaster, MA, NRHP-listed
Elm Street Fire House, Southbridge, MA, NRHP-listed
Globe Village Fire House, Southbridge, MA, NRHP-listed
Stoneham Firestation, Stoneham, MA, NRHP-listed
Central Fire Station (Taunton, Massachusetts), NRHP-listed
East Taunton Fire Station, Taunton, MA, NRHP-listed
Kilmer Street Fire Station, Taunton, MA, NRHP-listed
Whittenton Fire and Police Station, Taunton, MA, NRHP-listed
Weir Engine House, Taunton, MA, NRHP-listed
Moody Street Fire Station, Waltham, MA, NRHP-listed
Beacon Street Firehouse, Worcester, MA, NRHP-listed
Bloomingdale Firehouse, Worcester, MA, NRHP-listed
Cambridge Street Firehouse, Worcester, MA, NRHP-listed
Pleasant Street Firehouse, Worcester, MA, NRHP-listed
Providence Street Firehouse, Worcester, MA, NRHP-listed
Quinsigamond Firehouse, Worcester, MA, NRHP-listed
Webster Street Firehouse, Worcester, MA, NRHP-listed
Woodland Street Firehouse, Worcester, MA, NRHP-listed

Michigan

Adrian Engine House No. 1, Adrian, Michigan, NRHP-listed
Ann Arbor Central Fire Station, Ann Arbor, Michigan, NRHP-listed
Calumet Fire Station (1899), Calumet, Michigan, NRHP-listed, home of the Upper Peninsula Fire Fighters Memorial Museum
Engine House No. 11 (Detroit), NRHP-listed
Engine House No. 18 (Detroit), NRHP-listed
Hook and Ladder House No. 5-Detroit Fire Department Repair Shop, Detroit, Michigan, NRHP-listed
Hancock Town Hall and Fire Hall, Hancock, Michigan, NRHP-listed
Holland Old City Hall and Fire Station, Holland, Michigan, NRHP-listed
Houghton Fire Hall, Houghton, Michigan, included in NRHP-listed Shelden Avenue Historic District
Portage Street Fire Station, Kalamazoo, Michigan, NRHP-listed
Old Fire House No. 4 (Kalamazoo, Michigan), NRHP-listed
Engine House No. 3 (Kalamazoo, Michigan), NRHP-listed
Lake Linden Village Hall and Fire Station, Lake Linden, MI, NRHP-listed
 Central Fire Station (Muskegon, Michigan), NRHP-listed
Negaunee Fire Station, Negaunee, Michigan, NRHP-listed

Minnesota

Brandon Auditorium and Fire Hall, Brandon, MN, NRHP-listed
Firemen's Hall (Cannon Falls, Minnesota), NRHP-listed in Goodhue County, Minnesota
Fire Station No. 1 (Duluth, Minnesota), NRHP-listed
Minneapolis Fire Department Repair Shop, Minneapolis, MN, NRHP-listed
Station 13 Minneapolis Fire Department, Minneapolis, MN, NRHP-listed
Station 28 Minneapolis Fire Department, Minneapolis, MN, NRHP-listed
 Fire Station No. 19 (Minneapolis, Minnesota), NRHP-listed
Owatonna City and Firemen's Hall, Owatonna, MN, NRHP-listed
Perham Village Hall and Fire Station, Perham, MN, NRHP-listed
Pine Island City Hall and Fire Station, Pine Island, MN, NRHP-listed
Revere Fire Hall, Revere, MN, NRHP-listed
Tenney Fire Hall, Tenney, MN, NRHP-listed
Tower Fire Hall, Tower, MN, NRHP-listed
Wadena Fire and City Hall, Wadena, MN, NRHP-listed

Mississippi
Pascagoula Central Fire Station No. 1, Pascagoula, MS, NRHP-listed
 Central Fire Station (Jackson, Mississippi), listed on the NRHP in Mississippi

Missouri
Old California City Hall and Fire Station, California, MO, NRHP-listed
Fire Department Headquarters; Fire Station No. 2, Kansas City, MO, NRHP-listed
Pierce City Fire Station, Courthouse and Jail, Pierce City, MO, NRHP-listed
City Hose Company No. 9, St. Joseph, MO, NRHP-listed

Montana

Anaconda City Hall (1895), Anaconda, MT, NRHP-listed
Big Timber Town Hall, Big Timber, MT, NRHP-listed, also known as "Big Timber Fire Hall"
Fire House No. 2 (Billings, Montana), NRHP-listed
Garage and Fire Station (Fort Peck, Montana), NRHP-listed
Fire Hall (Joliet, Montana), NRHP-listed
Fort Benton Engine House, Fort Benton, MT, NRHP-listed

Nebraska
Benson City Hall (Omaha, Nebraska)
Florence Firehouse
Humphrey City Hall (1902), Humphrey, Nebraska
Sioux Ordnance Depot Fire & Guard Headquarters (1942), Sidney, Nebraska, NRHP-listed

Nevada
Tonopah Volunteer Firehouse and Gymnasium, Tonopah, NV, NRHP-listed

New Jersey
Assembly of Exempt Firemen Building, Hoboken, NJ, NRHP-listed, now the Hoboken Fire Department Museum
Bayonne Truck House No. 1, Bayonne, NJ, NRHP-listed, now the Chief John T. Brennan Fire Museum
 Engine House No. 3, Truck No. 2 (Hoboken, New Jersey), NRHP-listed
Cliffside Hose Company No. 4, Montclair, NJ, NRHP-listed
South Orange Fire Department, South Orange Village, NJ, NRHP-listed
Firehouse No. 4 (Plainfield, New Jersey), NRHP-listed
 Engine Company No. 2, Hoboken, NJ, NRHP-listed
 Engine Company No. 3, Hoboken, NJ, NRHP-listed
 Engine Company No. 4, Hoboken, NJ, NRHP-listed
 Engine Company No. 5, Hoboken, NJ, NRHP-listed
 Engine Company No. 6, Hoboken, NJ, NRHP-listed
Plainfield Central Fire Headquarters, Plainfield, NJ, NRHP-listed
Westfield Fire Headquarters, Westfield, NJ, NRHP-listed
Highland Hose No. 4, Kearny, NJ, NRHP-listed
West End Hose Company Number 3, Somerville, NJ, NRHP-listed, home of Somerville Fire Department Museum
Relief Home Company No. 2 Engine House, Raritan Borough, NJ, NRHP-listed

New Hampshire
Boscawen Academy and Much-I-Do-Hose House, Boscawen, NH, NRHP-listed

New Mexico
Monte Vista Fire Station, Albuquerque, NM, NRHP-listed
Santa Fe Railway Shops fire station, of the Santa Fe Railway Shops (Albuquerque), NM, NRHP-listed, oldest fire station in Albuquerque
1908 Clovis City Hall and Fire Station, Clovis, NM, NRHP-listed
Clovis Central Fire Station, Clovis, NM, NRHP-listed
Lovington Fire Department Building, Lovington, NM, NRHP-listed

New York
New York City Fire Museum, in FDNY Engine Company No. 30 (1904), Manhattan, New York City
Firemen's Hall (College Point, New York), NRHP-listed in Queens County
Fireman's Hall (Alfred, New York), NRHP-listed
Watts De Peyster Fireman's Hall, Tivoli, NY, NRHP-listed
Engine House No. 28 (Buffalo, New York), NRHP-listed
Cortland Fire Headquarters, Cortland, NY, NRHP-listed
Old Brooklyn Fire Headquarters, New York, NY, NRHP-listed
Alfred Dolge Hose Co. No. 1 Building, Dolgeville, NY, NRHP-listed
Cold Spring Harbor Fire District Hook and Ladder Company Building, Cold Spring Harbor, NY, NRHP-listed
Fire Hook and Ladder Company No. 14, New York, NY, NRHP-listed
Hook and Ladder No. 4, Albany, NY, NRHP-listed
Morgan Hook and Ladder Company, Naples, NY, NRHP-listed
Bay Shore Hose Company No. 1 Firehouse, Bay Shore, New York, NRHP-listed
Beacon Engine Company No. 1 Firehouse, Beacon, NY, NRHP-listed
Esek Bussey Firehouse, Troy, NY, NRHP-listed
Firehouse, Engine Company 31, New York, NY, NRHP-listed
Firehouse, Engine Company 33, New York, NY, NRHP-listed
Firthcliffe Firehouse, Cornwall, NY, NRHP-listed
Hyde Park Firehouse, Hyde Park, NY, NRHP-listed
Niagara Engine House, Poughkeepsie, New York, NRHP-listed
J.C. Osgood Firehouse, Troy, NY, NRHP-listed
Rescue Hook & Ladder Company No. 1 Firehouse, Roslyn, NY, NRHP-listed
Sea Cliff Firehouse, Sea Cliff, NY, NRHP-listed
Putnam and Mellor Engine and Hose Company Firehouse, Port Chester, NY, NRHP-listed
Upper Nyack Firehouse, Upper Nyack, NY, NRHP-listed
Port Henry Fire Department Building, Port Henry, NY, NRHP-listed
Rochester Fire Department Headquarters and Shops, Rochester, NY, NRHP-listed
 Central Fire Station (Schenectady, New York), listed on the NRHP in New York
Coney Island Fire Station Pumping Station, New York, NY, NRHP-listed
 Fire Station No. 4 (Elmira, New York), listed on NRHP in New York
Bay Shore Hose Company No. 1 Firehouse, Bay Shore, NY, NRHP-listed
O. H. Booth Hose Company, Poughkeepsie, NY, NRHP-listed
Lady Washington Hose Company, Poughkeepsie, NY, NRHP-listed
Putnam and Mellor Engine and Hose Company Firehouse, Port Chester, NY, NRHP-listed
West Endicott Hose Company No. 1, West Endicott, NY, NRHP-listed
Wiley Hose Company Building, Catskill, NY, NRHP-listed
Firehouse, Hook & Ladder Company 8, New York, NY, exterior famously used for the movie Ghostbusters

North Carolina
 Fire Station Number 4 (Asheville, North Carolina), NRHP-listed
 Fire Station No. 2 (Charlotte, North Carolina), NRHP-listed
 Central Fire Station (Greensboro, North Carolina), NRHP-listed
Henderson Fire Station and Municipal Building, Henderson, NC, NRHP-listed
Kinston Fire Station-City Hall, Kinston, NC, NRHP-listed

North Dakota
Hook and Ladder No. 1 and Hose Co. No. 2, Grand Forks, ND, NRHP-listed
Fire Hall (Bismarck, North Dakota), formerly NRHP-listed

Ohio
Anna Town Hall, Anna, OH, NRHP-listed
Cedarville Opera House, Cedarville, OH, NRHP-listed
Court Street Firehouse, Cincinnati, OH, NRHP-listed, now the Fire Museum of Greater Cincinnati
East Walnut Hills Firehouse, Cincinnati, OH, NRHP-listed
Engine House No. 1 (Sandusky, Ohio), NRHP-listed
Engine House No. 3 (Sandusky, Ohio), NRHP-listed
Engine House No. 5 (Columbus, Ohio), NRHP-listed
Engine House No. 6 (Columbus, Ohio), NRHP-listed
Engine House No. 7 (Columbus, Ohio), NRHP-listed
Engine House No. 12 (Columbus, Ohio), NRHP-listed
Engine House No. 16 (Columbus, Ohio), NRHP-listed
Dayton Fire Station No. 14, Dayton, OH, NRHP-listed
Dayton Fire Department Station No. 16, Dayton, OH, NRHP-listed
East Side Fire Station, Defiance, OH, NRHP-listed
Glenford Bank, Glenford, Ohio, NRHP-listed
Jamestown Opera House, Jamestown, Ohio, NRHP-listed
Leipsic Village Hall, Leipsic, Ohio, NRHP-listed, destroyed.
Lorain Fire Station No. 1, Lorain, OH, NRHP-listed
Levering Hall, Mount Gilead, OH, NRHP-listed
No. 5 Fire Station (Sandusky, Ohio), NRHP-listed
Northmoor Engine House, Columbus, Ohio
Portsmouth Fire Department No. 1, Portsmouth, OH, NRHP-listed
Waynesville Engine House and Lockup, Waynesville, OH, NRHP-listed

Oklahoma
Campus Fire Station, Stillwater, OK, NRHP-listed

Oregon
Astoria Fire House No. 2, Astoria, OR, NRHP-listed, now the Uppertown Firefighter's Museum
Grants Pass City Hall and Fire Station, Grants Pass, OR, NRHP-listed
Interstate Firehouse Cultural Center (1910), North Portland, OR
Portland Fire Station No. 7 (1927), Portland, OR, NRHP-listed
Portland Fire Station No. 17, Portland, OR, NRHP-listed
Portland Fire Station No. 23, Portland, OR, NRHP-listed
St. Johns City Hall, St. Johns, Portland, OR
Woodstock Fire Station, Woodstock, Portland, OR, now the Woodstock Community Center

Pennsylvania
Washington Hose and Steam Fire Engine Company, No. 1, Conshohocken, PA, NRHP-listed
Camp Curtin Fire Station, Harrisburg, PA, NRHP-listed
Pennsylvania National Fire Museum, Harrisburg, PA, in the 1899 fire station building of Reily Hose Company No. 10
Franklin Hose Company No. 28, Philadelphia, PA, NRHP-listed
Hope Hose Co. No. 6 and Fellowship Engine Co. No. 29, Philadelphia, PA, HABS-documented
Engine Company No. 1 and No. 30, Pittsburgh, PA
Hampden Firehouse, Reading, PA, NRHP-listed
Keystone Hook and Ladder Company, Reading, PA, NRHP-listed
Liberty Fire Company No. 5, Reading, PA, NRHP-listed, home of the Reading Area Fire-Fighters Museum
Municipal Building and Central Fire Station, 340, Scranton, PA, NRHP-listed
Laurel-Rex Fire Company House, York, PA, NRHP-listed

Rhode Island
 Fire Station No. 4 (Pawtucket, Rhode Island), NRHP-listed

South Carolina
North Columbia Fire Station No. 7, Columbia, SC, NRHP-listed
Columbia Central Fire Station, Columbia, SC, NRHP-listed

South Dakota
Delmont Pumphouse, Delmont, South Dakota, NRHP-listed
Redfield Light Plant and Fire Station, Redfield, SD, NRHP-listed
Central Fire Station (Sioux Falls, South Dakota), listed on the NRHP in South Dakota
South Side Fire Station No. 3, Sioux Falls, SD, NRHP-listed
Utica Fire and City Hall, Utica, SD, NRHP-listed

Tennessee
Fire Engine House No. 1 (Memphis, Tennessee), home of the Fire Museum of Memphis
 James Geddes Engine Company No. 6, Nashville, TN, NRHP-listed
Molyneux Chevrolet Company-Rockwood Fire Department Building, Rockwood, TN, NRHP-listed
Fire Hall No. 1, Nashville, TN, NRHP-listed
Holly Street Fire Hall, Nashville, TN, NRHP-listed
 Fire Station No. 5 (Knoxville, Tennessee), listed on the NRHP in Tennessee

Texas
Abilene Fire Station No. 2, Abilene, TX, NRHP-listed
Austin Central Fire Station 1, Austin, TX, NRHP-listed
Fire Museum of Texas, Beaumont, Texas, a Recorded Texas Landmark
Dallas Fire Station No. 16, Dallas, TX, NRHP-listed
Number 4 Hook and Ladder Company, Dallas, TX, NRHP-listed
 Fire Engine House No. 9, Houston, TX, NRHP-listed
Houston Fire Station No. 7, Houston, TX, NRHP-listed, home of Houston Fire Museum
Houston Heights Fire Station, Houston, TX, NRHP-listed
Central Fire Station (Pampa, Texas), NRHP-listed
Fire Station and City Hall, San Marcos, TX, NRHP-listed

Utah
Brigham City Fire Station/City Hall (1909), Brigham City, Utah, NRHP-listed
Firestation No. 8 (Salt Lake City, Utah), NRHP-listed
Spanish Fork Fire Station, Spanish Fork, Utah, former building, which formerly was NRHP-listed

Vermont
W.H. Bradford Hook and Ladder Fire House, Bennington, Vermont, NRHP-listed
Ethan Allen Engine Company No. 4, Burlington, Vermont, NRHP-listed

Virginia
Cherrydale Volunteer Fire House, also known as Fire Station No. 3, Arlington, Virginia, NRHP-listed
Chincoteague Fire Department, Chincoteague
Fire Station No. 1, Roanoke, NRHP-listed
Fire Station No. 5, Roanoke, NRHP-listed
Roanoke City Firehouse No. 6, Roanoke, NRHP-listed
Steamer Company Number 5, Richmond, NRHP-listed

Washington
Everett Fire Station No. 2, Everett, WA, NRHP-listed
 Fire Station No. 18 (Seattle, Washington), NRHP-listed
 Fire Station No. 23 (Seattle, Washington), NRHP-listed
 Fire Station No. 25 (Seattle, Washington), NRHP-listed
Wallingford Fire and Police Station, Seattle, WA, NRHP-listed
Spokane Fire Station No. 3, Spokane, WA, NRHP-listed
Fireboat Station (1928), Tacoma, Washington, NRHP-listed.  Station for three fireboats.
 Fire Station No. 1 (Tacoma, Washington), NRHP-listed
 Fire Station No. 2 (Tacoma, Washington), NRHP-listed
 Engine House No. 4 (Tacoma, Washington), NRHP-listed
 Fire Station No. 5 (Tacoma, Washington), NRHP-listed
 Engine House No. 8 (Tacoma, Washington), NRHP-listed
 Engine House No. 9 (Tacoma, Washington), NRHP-listed
 Fire Station No. 10 (Tacoma, Washington), NRHP-listed
 Engine House No. 11 (Tacoma, Washington), NRHP-listed
 Engine House No. 13 (Tacoma, Washington), NRHP-listed
 Fire Station No. 14 (Tacoma, Washington), NRHP-listed
 Fire Station No. 15 (Tacoma, Washington), NRHP-listed
Wenatchee Fire Station No. 1, Wenatchee, WA, NRHP-listed

West Virginia
Warwood Fire Station, Wheeling, WV, NRHP-listed

Wisconsin
Aetna Station No. 5, Fond du Lac, WI, NRHP-listed
Green Lake Village Hall, Green Lake, WI, NRHP-listed
Fire and police station, and iconic Hose Tower, in Greendale Historic District, a U.S. National Historic Landmark district
Jefferson Fire Station, Jefferson, WI, NRHP-listed
Fire Station No. 4 (Madison, Wisconsin), NRHP-listed
Mequon Town Hall and Fire Station Complex, Mequon, WI, NRHP-listed
Chief Lippert Fire Station, Milwaukee, WI, NRHP-listed
Omro Village Hall and Engine House, Omro, WI, NRHP-listed
Brooklyn No. 4 Fire House, Oshkosh, WI, NRHP-listed
Port Washington Fire Engine House, Port Washington, WI, NRHP-listed
Sauk City Fire Station, Sauk City, WI, NRHP-listed
Tigerton Village Hall and Engine House, Tigerton, WI, NRHP-listed

Wyoming
Casper Fire Department Station No. 1, Casper, WY, NRHP-listed

Washington, D.C.
 Old Engine Company No. 6, Washington, DC, NRHP-listed
 Engine House No. 10 (Washington, D.C.), NRHP-listed 
 Engine Company 12, Washington, DC, NRHP-listed
 Engine Company 16-Truck Company 3, Washington, DC, NRHP-listed
 Engine Company 17, Washington, DC, NRHP-listed
Engine Company 19 (Washington, D.C.), Washington, D.C., NRHP-listed
 Engine Company 21, Washington, DC, NRHP-listed
 Engine Company 22, Washington, DC, NRHP-listed
 Engine Company 23, Washington, DC, NRHP-listed
 Engine Company 25 (Washington, D.C.), NRHP-listed
 Engine Company 26 (Washington, D.C.), NRHP-listed
 Old Engine Company 26 (Washington, D.C.), NRHP-listed
 Engine Company 27 (Washington, D.C.), NRHP-listed
 Engine Company 29, Washington, DC, NRHP-listed
 Engine Company 31, Washington, DC, NRHP-listed
Fire Department Headquarters-Fire Alarm Headquarters, Washington, DC, NRHP-listed
Truck Company F, Washington, D.C., NRHP-listed
Truck House No. 13 (Washington, D.C.), NRHP-listed
Vigilant Firehouse, Washington, DC, NRHP-listed

Puerto Rico
Parque de Bombas Maximiliano Merced, Aguas Buenas, PR, NRHP-listed
Ceiba Fire Station, Ceiba, PR, NRHP-listed
Parque de Bombas de Ponce, Ponce, PR, NRHP-listed
Instituto de Música Juan Morel Campos, Ponce, PR, NRHP-listed
Yabucoa Fire Station, Yabucoa, PR, NRHP-listed

Vatican City

Vatican City's fire station, served by the Corps of Firefighters of the Vatican City State

See also
List of police stations
List of fire department specialty facilities, including fire alarm buildings and pumping stations
List of firefighting monuments and memorials
List of firefighting museums
Fireboats
List of fire lookout towers
Lists of fire stations having approximately same name:
Central Fire Station (disambiguation)
Engine House (disambiguation)
Fire Hall (disambiguation)
Fire Station No. 1 (disambiguation)
Fire Station No. 2 (disambiguation)
Fire Station No. 3 (disambiguation)
Fire Station No. 4 (disambiguation)
Fire Station No. 5 (disambiguation)
Fire Station No. 6 (disambiguation)
Fire Station No. 7 (disambiguation)
Fire Station No. 8 (disambiguation)
Fire Station No. 9 (disambiguation)
Fire Station No. 10 (disambiguation)
Fire Station No. 11 (disambiguation)
Fire Station No. 12 (disambiguation)
Fire Station No. 13 (disambiguation)
Fire Station No. 14 (disambiguation)
Fire Station No. 15 (disambiguation)
Fire Station No. 16 (disambiguation)
Fire Station No. 17 (disambiguation)
Fire Station No. 18 (disambiguation)
Fire Station No. 19 (disambiguation)
Fire Station No. 20 (disambiguation)
Fire Station No. 21 (disambiguation)
Fire Station No. 22 (disambiguation)
Fire Station No. 23 (disambiguation)
Fire Station No. 25 (disambiguation)
Fire Station No. 30 (disambiguation)

References

External links

Fire stations
Stations